Plastik Salyan FK was an Azerbaijani football club from Salyan founded in 1971, as Himik Salyan. They changed their name to Plastik Salyan in 1990 before disbanding in 1997.

League and domestic cup history

References 

Plastik Salyan
Association football clubs established in 1971
Defunct football clubs in Azerbaijan
Association football clubs disestablished in 1997